Ars subtilior (Latin for 'subtler art') is a musical style characterized by rhythmic and notational complexity, centered on Paris, Avignon in southern France, and also in northern Spain at the end of the fourteenth century. The style also is found in the French Cypriot repertory. Often the term is used in contrast with ars nova, which applies to the musical style of the preceding period from about 1310 to about 1370; though some scholars prefer to consider ars subtilior a subcategory of the earlier style.  Primary sources for ars subtilior are the Chantilly Codex, the Modena Codex (Mod A M 5.24), and the Turin Manuscript (Torino J.II.9).

Overview and history

Musically, the productions of the ars subtilior are highly refined, complex, and difficult to sing, and probably were produced, sung, and enjoyed by a small audience of specialists and connoisseurs.  Musicologist Richard Hoppin suggests the superlative ars subtilissima, saying, "not until the twentieth century did music again reach the most subtle refinements and rhythmic complexities of the manneristic style."  They are almost exclusively secular songs, and have as their subject matter love, war, chivalry, and stories from classical antiquity. There are even some songs written in praise of public figures (for example Antipope Clement VII).  Daniel Albright compares avant-garde and modernist music of the 20th century's "emphasis on generating music through technical experiment" to the precedent set by the ars subtilior movement's "autonomous delight in extending the kingdom of sound."  He cites Baude Cordier's perpetual canon Tout par compas (All by compass am I composed), notated on a circular staff.

Albright contrasts this motivation with "expressive urgency" and "obedience to rules of craft" and, indeed, "ars subtilior" was coined by musicologist Ursula Günther in 1960 to avoid the negative connotations of the terms manneristic style and mannered notation.  (Günther's coinage was based on references in Tractatus de diversis figuris, attributed to Philippus de Caserta, to composers moving to a style "post modum subtiliorem comparantes" and developing an "artem magis subtiliter".)

One of the centers of activity of the style was Avignon at the end of the Babylonian Captivity of the Papacy and during the Great Schism (1378–1417), the time during which the Western Church had a pope both in Rome and in Avignon. The town on the Rhône had developed into an active cultural center, and produced the most significant surviving body of secular song of the late fourteenth century.

The style spread into northern Spain and as far as Cyprus (which was a French cultural outpost at the time).  French, Flemish, Spanish and Italian composers used the style.

Notational characteristics
Manuscripts of works in the ars subtilior occasionally were themselves in unusual and expressive shapes, as a form of eye music. As well as Baude Cordier's  circular canon and the heart-shaped score shown above, Jacob Senleches's La Harpe de melodie is written in the shape of a harp.

List of composers
The main composers of the ars subtilior (those from whom at least three compositions in this style are known) are Anthonello de Caserta, Johannes Cuvelier, Egidius, Galiot, Matteo da Perugia, Philipoctus de Caserta, Jacob Senleches, and Trebor. Other composers associated with the style include:
 Johannes Ciconia, Sus un fontayne
 Baude Cordier, Tout par compas (Rondeau-canon) and Belle bonne sage
 Martinus Fabri
 Paolo da Firenze
 Guido de Lange, Dieux gart (Rondeau)
 Johannes Symonis Hasprois
 Matheus de Sancto Johanne
 Solage, Fumeux fume par fumée (Rondeau)
Antonio Zacara da Teramo, Sumite karissime
Anonymous composers at the Nicosia court of King Janus of Cyprus

Examples

References

Sources
Albright, Daniel. 2004. Modernism and Music: An Anthology of Sources. University of Chicago Press. .
Apel, Willi. 1973. "The Development of French Secular Music During the Fourteenth Century". Musica Disciplina 27:41–59.
 Günther, Ursula. 1960. "Die Anwendung der Diminution in der Handschrift Chantilly 1047". Archiv für Musikwissenschaft 17:1–21.
 Hoppin, Richard H. 1978. Medieval Music. New York, W.W. Norton & Co., 1978.  .
 Josephson, Nors S. 2001. "Ars Subtilior". The New Grove Dictionary of Music and Musicians, second edition, edited by Stanley Sadie and John Tyrrell. London: Macmillan Publishers.

Further reading

Apel, Willi. 1950. "French Secular Music of the Late Fourteenth Century". Mediaeval Academy of America. text online
 
 Berger, Anna Maria Busse. 2002. "The Evolution of Rhythmic Notation". In The Cambridge History of Western Music Theory, edited by Thomas Street Christensen, 628–56. The Cambridge History of Music. Cambridge: Cambridge University Press. 
 Fallows, David. "Ars nova" in The New Grove Dictionary of Music and Musicians, ed. Stanley Sadie.  20 vol.  London, Macmillan Publishers Ltd., 1980.  .
 Gleason, Harold, and Warren Becker, Music in the Middle Ages and Renaissance Music Literature Outlines Series I.  Bloomington, Indiana.  Frangipani Press, 1986.  .
 Günther, Ursula. 1963. "Das Ende der Ars Nova". Die Musikforschung 16:105–120.
 Günther, Ursula. 1964. "Zur Biographie einiger Komponisten der Ars Subtilior". Archiv für Musikwissenschaft 21:172–99.
 Günther, Ursula. 1965. The Motets of the Manuscripts Chantilly, Musée condé, 564 (olim 1047) and Modena, Biblioteca estense, a. M. 5, 24 (olim lat. 568). Corpus Mensurabilis Musicae 39. Neuhausen: American Institute of Musicology. Unaltered reprint, 1998.
 Günther, Ursula. 1991. "Die Ars subtilior". Hamburger Jahrbuch für Musikwissenschaft 11: 277–88.
 Hentschel, Frank. 2001. "Der Streit um die Ars Nova: Nur ein Scherz?"  Archiv für Musikwissenschaft 58:110–30.
 Hoppin, Richard H. 1960–1963.  Cypriot-French Repertory (15th c.) of the Manuscript Torino, Biblioteca Nazionale, J.II.9, 4 vols. Corpus Mensurabilis Musicae 21. Rome : American Institute of Musicology.
 Hoppin, Richard H. 1968. Cypriot Plainchant of the Manuscript Torino, Biblioteca Nazionale J. II. 9, facsimile edition with commentary. Musicological Studies and Documents 19. Rome: American Institute of Musicology. .
 Josephson, Nora S. "Ars subtilior" in The New Grove Dictionary of Music and Musicians, ed. Stanley Sadie.  20 vol.  London, Macmillan Publishers Ltd., 1980.  .
 
 Köhler, Laurie. 1990. Pythagoreisch-platonische Proportionen in Werken der ars nova und ars subtilior. 2 vols. Göttinger musikwissenschaftliche Arbeiten 12. Kassel and New York: Bärenreiter. 
 Leech-Wilkinson, Daniel. 1990. "Ars Antiqua—Ars Nova—Ars Subtilior". In Antiquity and the Middle Ages: From Ancient Greece to the Fifteenth Century, edited by James McKinnon, 218–40. Man & Music. London: Macmillan.  (cased)  (pbk)
 Newes, Virginia Ervin. 1977. "Imitation in the Ars Nova and Ars Subtilior". Revue belge de musicologie/Belgisch tijdschrift voor muziekwetenschap. 31:38–59.
 Pirrotta, Nino. 1966. "Ars Nova e stil novo". Rivista Italiana di Musicologia 1:3–19
 Plumley, Yolanda M. 1991. "Style and Structure in the Late 14th-Century Chanson". Ph.D. diss., University of Exeter.
 Plumley, Yolanda M. 1996. The Grammar of Fourteenth Century Melody: Tonal Organization and Compositional Process in the Chansons of Guillaume de Machaut and the Ars Subtilior. Outstanding Dissertations in Music from British Universities. New York: Garland. 
 Plumley, Yolanda M. 1999. "Citation and Allusion in the Late Ars Nova: The Case of 'Esperance' and the 'En attendant' songs". Early Music History 18:287–363.
 Plumley, Yolanda, and Anne Stone. 2008.  Codex Chantilly: Bibliothèque du Château de Chantilly Ms. 564 facsimile edition with commentary.  Turnhout, Belgium: Brepols (distributed by Old Manuscripts & Incunabula). .
 Smith, F. Joseph. 1964. "Ars Nova: A Re-Definition? (Observations in the Light of Speculum Musicae I by Jacques de Liège" Part 1. Musica Disciplina 18:19–35.
 Smith, F. Joseph. 1965. "Ars Nova: A Re-Definition?" Part 2. Musica Disciplina 19:83–97.
 Smith, F. Joseph. 1983. "Jacques de Liège's Criticism of the Notational Innovations of the Ars nova". The Journal of Musicological Research 4: 267–313
 Stone, Anne. 1996. "Che cosa c'è di più sottile riguardo l'ars subtilior?" Rivista Italiana di Musicologia 31:3–31.
 Tanay, Dorit. 1999. Noting Music, Making Culture: The Intellectual Context of Rhythmic Notation, 1250–1400. Musicological Studies and Documents 46. Holzgerlingen: American Institute of Musicology and Hänssler-Verlag. 

Composition schools
 
Renaissance music
French styles of music
Italian styles of music
Spanish styles of music